Daubenya aurea  is a species of Daubenya found growing as a geophytic bulb in Roggeveld Mountains in North Cape Province, South Africa.

References

External links
 
 
 Daubenya aurea in SANBI

aurea